LWT - Food Science and Technology, formerly known as Lebensmittel-Wissenschaft & Technologie, is a peer-reviewed scientific journal published by Elsevier. It is the official journal of the Swiss Society of Food Science and Technology and the International Union of Food Science and Technology. The editor-in-chief is Rakesh K. Singh. According to the Journal Citation Reports, the journal's 2020 impact factor is 4.952.

From January 2022 LWT will become an open access journal.

References

External links 
 
 Swiss Society of Food Science and Technology

English-language journals
Publications established in 1968
Food science journals
Elsevier academic journals